Asa Daklugie (born abt. 1869-1955) was a Chief of the Nedni Apaches, the Southern Band of the Chiricahua, son to Juh and nephew to Geronimo.

His father was an Apache Chief, Juh, and his mother was Ishton. Another close relative to Asa was his uncle Geronimo.

Early years 
Daklugie served as Geronimo's official interpreter when interacting with non-native people. He was raised in the Chiricahua Apache religion and never wavered even when many Indians converted to Christianity. As he grew older, he still preserves the knowledge of this religion from the outsiders to keep it from the American world. Daklugie, following closely in the beliefs of Geronimo believed in God the Apache called Ussen, who was the "Creator of Life." It has been recorded that Ussen gave Geronimo courage and visions about what were to happen in the future.

Daklugie traveled all around the States after the death of his father. These places include Mexico, Fort Pickens and back to Carlisle. He was also responsible for the movement of the Apache into new territory different from where they were originally located at,

Carlisle Indian School 
Asa was taken to the Carlisle Indian School in Carlisle, Pennsylvania on December 8, 1886 as a prisoner of war. He was discharged from the school on November 7, 1895. He was there from the ages 12–17.
At this Indian school, the intention was to assimilate the Indian children into American society. The boys and girls were dressed up in "trousers, skirts and jackets... and given American names" [once they moved like the wind]. This is how Daklugie got the name Asa. They weren't allowed to speak their native dialect either, the U.S government wanted to remove any trace of their native culture so they would have no other option but to learn the white ways of life. Asa was at the head of the boys class, as the names were given out in alphabetical order, this leaving him with the name starting with an "A". They also estimated the birth dates of the children brought to the school for records.

Some activities done at the school included learning to read, write and speak English, household chores, learning to play the drums, gym class, farming, milking cows, and there were some outdoor activities for the kids to do. There were sports teams at Carlisle and Asa was on the track team. He also showed interest in the maps while talking with his teachers at Carlisle and wasn't scolded when talking about it in their native language. Asa and his classmate George Martine read many books, including books about their people from the library. The activities done here at the Carlisle Indian School was training the children for their future settlement in Mescalera.

Here he met his wife, Ramona Chihuahua Daklugie and went on to have 9 children with her. Two of these children, Maude and Sarah Daklugie were later enrolled into the same school as their father.

Later years 
After leaving the Carlisle Indian School, Asa moved to Fort Sill to reunite with his family. Later in his life, he bought a ranch to live at with his family after having his freedom granted.

Asa Daklugie was involved in the Apache Wars, and during that time he was captured as a prisoner of war for 25 years.

He also served as a translator for Steven Melvil Barret's book Geronimo: His Own Story.

References

Sources 

 Ball, Eve. 2013. Indeh: An Apache Odyssey
 Stockel, H. Henrietta 2004. On the Blood Road to Jesus: Christianity and the Chiricahua Apaches
 Kraft, Louis. 2000. Gatewood and Geronimo.
 Ragsdale, John, W. 2011. Values in Transition: The Chiricahua Apache from 1886-1914
 https://carlisleindian.dickinson.edu/student_files/asa-daklugie-da-klu-gie-student-file
 Tucker, Spencer; Arnold, James R; Weiner, Roberta. 2011. The Encyclopedia of North American Indian Wars, 1607-1890: A Political, Social and Military History
 Ove, Robert S.; Stockel, H. Henrietta. 1997. Geronimo:s Kids: A Teacher's Lessons on the Apache Reservation
 Geronimo; Barrett, S.M. 1996. Geronimo: His Own Story: The Autobiography of a Great Patriot Warrior

Wikipedia Student Program
1860s births
1995 deaths
Native American leaders
Chiricahua people